Woodland Terrace is a neighborhood within the city limits of Tampa, Florida. As of the 2000 census the neighborhood had a population of 959. The ZIP Code serving the neighborhood is 33610.

Geography
Woodland Terrace boundaries are Live Oaks Square to the south, Northeast Community to the east, 30th Street to the west, and River Grove to the north.

Demographics
Source: Hillsborough County Atlas

At the 2010 census there were 858 people living in the neighborhood. The population density was 1,133/mi2. The racial makeup of the neighborhood was 8% White, 89% African American, 0% Native American, 0% Asian, 1% from other races, and 2% from two or more races. Hispanic or Latino of any race were 9%.

Of the 343 households 38% had children under the age of 18 living with them, 41% were married couples living together, 30% had a female householder with no husband present, and 2% were non-families. 22% of households were made up of individuals.

The age distribution was 30% under the age of 18, 19% from 18 to 34, 20% from 35 to 49, 17% from 50 to 64, and 17% 65 or older. For every 100 females, there were 75.3 males.

The per capita income for the neighborhood was $16,699. About 15% of the population were below the poverty line, 35% of those are under the age of 18.

Transportation
The community is served primarily by three HARTline bus lines:

Line 5 - Downtown Tampa to U.A.T.C. (via 40th Street)
Line 18 - Downtown Tampa to U.A.T.C. (via 30th Street)
Line 41 - Netpark to Hanley/Waters Plaza ''(via 30th Street and Hanna Avenue)

See also
Neighborhoods in Tampa, Florida

References

External links
Woodland Terrace

Neighborhoods in Tampa, Florida